Francisco Alexandre Lacerda Chaló (born 10 February 1964) is a Portuguese former footballer who played as an attacking midfielder, and a current manager.

Career
Born in Ermesinde, Porto Metropolitan Area, Chaló began managing at the district level with A.C. Alfenense and F.C. Pedras Rubras. After taking the latter to the third tier, he had three years with C.D. Feirense in the Segunda Liga. On 30 May 2007, he moved up to the Primeira Liga, succeeding Fernando Mira at Associação Naval 1º de Maio. He was dismissed on 16 September, having taken two points from four games.

Chaló then returned to Feirense in the second division for 18 months, being shown the door in December 2009 when they were fourth. On 8 March 2011, he signed with F.C. Penafiel for the rest of the season, tasked with avoiding relegation.

In March 2013, Chaló was appointed as the manager of S.C. Covilhã following Fanã's departure. After guiding them to safety, he achieved a mid-table finish in the following season. Despite interest from clubs to acquire his services, he remained with the Leões da Serra, and guided them to fourth – their best finish since the Segunda Liga's formation – in the 2014–15 season, missing out on promotion to the Primeira Liga on goal difference.

Going into the 2015–16 season, Covilhã were tipped as one of the favorites in the race for promotion, but due a run of poor results during the first half the season, his side only managed to finish in fourteenth place, 22 points less than their previous season, and he departed.

In December 2016, Chaló returned to management  by signing a one-year deal with Académico de Viseu FC. He left in February 2018 after a run of seven games without a win, and took the job at Leixões S.C. of the same league days later.

In June 2018, with a year left on his contract with the club from Matosinhos, he rescinded it and joined Paradou AC of the Algerian Ligue Professionnelle 1. He left the club in August 2020.

In 2022, he returned to Paradou AC. He left after a run of poor results during the first half the season.

Managerial statistics

References

External links

1964 births
Living people
People from Valongo
Association football midfielders
Portuguese footballers
Segunda Divisão players
C.D. Feirense players
CD Candal players
Portuguese football managers
C.D. Feirense managers
Primeira Liga managers
Associação Naval 1º de Maio managers
F.C. Penafiel managers
S.C. Covilhã managers
Académico de Viseu F.C. managers
Portuguese expatriate football managers
Algerian Ligue Professionnelle 1 managers
Expatriate football managers in Algeria
Paradou AC managers
Sportspeople from Porto District